(), formerly known as Xihaigu (Xiao'erjing: قُ‌يُوًا شِ), is a prefecture-level city in the Ningxia Hui Autonomous Region of the People's Republic of China. It occupies the southernmost section of the region, bordering Gansu province to the east, south, and due west. This is also the site of Mount Sumeru Grottoes, which is among the ten most famous grottoes in China. As of the end of 2018, the total resident population in Guyuan was 1,124,200.

History
During the Warring States Period, Guyuan belonged to the territory of Qin state, later Qin Dynasty. The original name of the city began in the Ming dynasty (1452 AD). Because of the importance of its transportation in history, Guyuan was a war gate where Chinese soldiers trained and prepared to fight with northwestern minorities. In the Tang dynasty, most of the dealers from middle Asia need to go through this gate, then went to the capital, Chang’an.

According to the First Founder's Biography in History of Yuan Dynasty, Genghis Khan died in Liupan Mountain in Guyuan in 1227 AD, after a war with the Xixia dynasty for two decades.

Liupanshan National Forest Park
Liupanshan National Forest Park is one of the most important features of Guyuan, with more than 530 species of wild medicinal plants. There are a number of diversified animals inhabited in the forest, for instance, the national first-class protected animal golden leopard, the third-class protected animal forest musk deer, golden eagle, and red-bellied golden pheasant.

Administrative divisions

Geography and climate
Guyuan has a monsoon-influenced humid continental climate (Köppen Dwb), with long, cold, dry winters, and warm, rainier summers. With temperatures cooled by the elevation that exceeds , highs average slightly below freezing in January and reach only  in July. Much of the year's precipitation is delivered from June to September.

Transportation
The city is served by Guyuan Liupanshan Airport, though travelers may also choose Zhongwei Xiangshan Airport and Yinchuan Hedong International Airport as well. The G70 Fuzhou–Yinchuan Expressway passes through the area on its way to the regional capital of Yinchuan.

As there is no high-speed railways to Guyuan,  to Guyuan from a major city is an approximately 4-hour drive from Yinchuan, which is actually faster than traveling by train, .

References

External links
Afarther - A year-long commentary and photos of life in Guyuan by Allister Klingensmith

 
Prefecture-level divisions of Ningxia
Cities in Ningxia